Clarence McKinney (born December 26, 1970) is an American football coach.  He is the head football coach at Texas Southern University.

Early years
McKinney played football at Montana State for three years before transferring to the University of Mary, where he achieved a bachelor's degree in elementary education.

Coaching career
McKinney's first head coaching job was at Jack Yates High School in Houston, Texas, where he compiled a record of 30–8. McKinney then began a long tenure as an assistant for Kevin Sumlin, being on Sumlin's staffs at Houston, Texas A&M, and Arizona.

McKinney was named the head coach of Texas Southern on December 3, 2018.

Influences
In addition to Kevin Sumlin, McKinney said he learned from Dana Holgorsen and Kliff Kingsbury.

Head coaching record

College

References

1970 births
Living people
Sportspeople from Houston
Players of American football from Houston
Montana State Bobcats football players
American football quarterbacks
American football wide receivers
Arizona Wildcats football coaches
Houston Cougars football coaches
Texas A&M Aggies football coaches
Texas Southern Tigers football coaches
High school football coaches in Texas
University of Mary alumni
Mary Marauders football players